Colobothea caramaschii is a species of beetle in the family Cerambycidae. It was described by Monné in 2005. It is known from Venezuela.

References

caramaschii
Beetles described in 2005